Albert Peter Anstey (born 10 May 1966) is a Canadian former professional darts player who has played in the British Darts Organisation (BDO) events.

Career
Anstey won the Canada National Championship in 1989, beating Bob Sinnaeve in the final. He also played in the Winmau World Masters the same year, losing in the first round to Alan Warriner.

He played in the 1990 BDO World Darts Championship, losing in the first round to former World Champion John Lowe. He played in 1991, losing in the first round Kevin Kenny. He played in 1993, beating in the first round by Sean Downs and losing to the second round Wayne Weening.

World Championship results

BDO
 1990: Last 32: (lost to John Lowe 1–3) (sets)
 1991: Last 32: (lost to Kevin Kenny 2–3)
 1993: Last 16: (lost to Wayne Weening 0–3)

External links
Albert Anstey's stats on Darts Database

Canadian darts players
1966 births
Living people
Sportspeople from Windsor, Ontario
British Darts Organisation players